In mathematics, the total derivative of a function  at a point is the best linear approximation near this point of the function with respect to its arguments.  Unlike partial derivatives, the total derivative approximates the function with respect to all of its arguments, not just a single one.  In many situations, this is the same as considering all partial derivatives simultaneously.  The term "total derivative" is primarily used when  is a function of several variables, because when  is a function of a single variable, the total derivative is the same as the ordinary derivative of the function.

The total derivative as a linear map
Let  be an open subset.  Then a function  is said to be (totally) differentiable at a point  if there exists a linear transformation   such that

A function is (totally) differentiable if its total derivative exists at every point in its domain.

To do so, write

where  equals the error in the approximation.

The function  is differentiable if and only if each of its components  is differentiable, so when studying total derivatives, it is often possible to work one coordinate at a time in the codomain. However, the same is not true of the coordinates in the domain. When  is not so rough, this cannot happen.

The total derivative as a differential form
When the function under consideration is real-valued, the total derivative can be recast using differential forms. For example, suppose that  is a differentiable function of variables .

The linear approximation property of the total derivative implies that if

is a small vector (where the  denotes transpose, so that this vector is a column vector), then

Heuristically, this suggests that if  are infinitesimal increments in the coordinate directions, then

In fact, the notion of the infinitesimal, which is merely symbolic here, can be equipped with extensive mathematical structure. Techniques, such as the theory of differential forms, effectively give analytical and algebraic descriptions of objects like infinitesimal increments, . For instance,  may be inscribed as a linear functional on the vector space . Evaluating  at a vector  in  measures how much  points in the th coordinate direction. The total derivative  is a linear combination of linear functionals and hence is itself a linear functional. This point of view makes the total derivative an instance of the exterior derivative.

Suppose now that  is a vector-valued function, that is, . The total derivative  amalgamates these forms into a single object and is therefore an instance of a vector-valued differential form.

The chain rule for total derivatives

The chain rule has a particularly elegant statement in terms of total derivatives.

This is enormously useful in applications, as it makes it possible to account for essentially arbitrary dependencies among the arguments of a composite function.

Example: Differentiation with direct dependencies
Suppose that f is a function of two variables, x and y. However, in some situations, x and y may be dependent. For example, it might happen that f is constrained to a curve . In this case, we are actually interested in the behavior of the composite function . The partial derivative of f with respect to x does not give the true rate of change of f with respect to changing x because changing x necessarily changes y. However, the chain rule for the total derivative takes such dependencies into account. Write . Then, the chain rule says

By expressing the total derivative using Jacobian matrices, this becomes:

For example, suppose

The rate of change of f with respect to x is usually the partial derivative of f with respect to x; in this case,

However, if y depends on x, the partial derivative does not give the true rate of change of f as x changes because the partial derivative assumes that y is fixed.  Suppose we are constrained to the line

Then

and the total derivative of f with respect to x is

which we see is not equal to the partial derivative .  Instead of immediately substituting for y in terms of x, however, we can also use the chain rule as above:

Example: Differentiation with indirect dependencies
While one can often perform substitutions to eliminate indirect dependencies, the chain rule provides for a more efficient and general technique. Suppose  is a function of time  and  variables  which themselves depend on time.

This expression is often used in physics for a gauge transformation of the Lagrangian, as two Lagrangians that differ only by the total time derivative of a function of time and the  generalized coordinates lead to the same equations of motion. An interesting example concerns the resolution of causality concerning the Wheeler–Feynman time-symmetric theory.  The operator in brackets (in the final expression above) is also called the total derivative operator (with respect to ).

Here there is no  term since  itself does not depend on the independent variable  directly.

Total differential equation

A total differential equation is a differential equation expressed in terms of total derivatives. Since the exterior derivative is coordinate-free, in a sense that can be given a technical meaning, such equations are intrinsic and geometric.

Application to equation systems

In economics, it is common for the total derivative to arise in the context of a system of equations. For example, a simple supply-demand system might specify the quantity q of a product demanded as a function D of its price p and consumers' income I, the latter being an exogenous variable, and might specify the quantity supplied by producers as a function S of its price and two exogenous resource cost variables r and w. The resulting system of equations

determines the market equilibrium values of the variables p and q. The total derivative  of p with respect to r, for example, gives the sign and magnitude of the reaction of the market price to the exogenous variable r.

Application to continuity equation

See also

 
  - generalization of the total derivative

References 

 A. D. Polyanin and V. F. Zaitsev, Handbook of Exact Solutions for Ordinary Differential Equations (2nd edition), Chapman & Hall/CRC Press, Boca Raton, 2003. 
 From thesaurus.maths.org  total derivative

External links

 
 Ronald D. Kriz (2007) Envisioning total derivatives of scalar functions of two dimensions using raised surfaces and tangent planes from Virginia Tech

Differential calculus
Differential operators
Lagrangian mechanics
Mathematical analysis
Multivariable calculus